Eucelatoria fasciata is a species of tachinid fly in the genus Eucelatoria of the family Tachinidae.

Distribution
Chile, Peru.

References

Exoristinae
Diptera of South America
Insects described in 1927
Taxa named by Charles Henry Tyler Townsend